Moreland City Football Club is an Australian soccer club based in Coburg, Victoria, Melbourne. The club currently competes in the National Premier Leagues Victoria.

History
It was founded in 1990, when Moreland Park Rangers, formerly Moreland FC, merged with Coburg to form Moreland City. In 1991, the club competed in the Victorian State League Division 3.

Moreland had successive relegations in 1992 and 1993, falling from Victorian State League Division 3 to Victorian Provisional League Division 1, but were promoted back to  State League 4 after winning the league in 1995. The Club was again promoted in 1998 to State League 3 after taking out the league title. In 2000, City moved up to State League Division 2 Nth-West after a restructuring of Victorian football.

The Club stayed in State League 2 North West for the next eight years, until their relegation in 2008. Moreland immediately bounced back in 2009, achieving promotion with a second-placed finish. In 2010, former player and coach Maurice Bisetto took over. City were expected to be relegation candidates, but managed to finish a surprising third, with Club legend Kam Simsek winning the league golden boot. In 2010, Moreland endured a similar season, finishing in fourth place. Sam Wade won the League Best & Fairest and fellow Welshman Darren Griffiths took out the League Golden Boot.

In 2012, Moreland City finished in second place, qualifying for the promotion playoff, but lost to Box Hill United SC. Welshman Adam Orme won the League Golden Boot award.

In 2013 Moreland City they took out the State League Division 2 North West League Championship, reaching the State League One for the first time since the Club was re-founded in 1990.

After a restructuring of football in Victoria, resulting in the creation of the National Premier Leagues Victoria, Moreland City remained in the State League One North West division, which was now the third, rather than the second tier of football in Victoria, below the NPL and NPL1 divisions.

Moreland City took out the State League One title in 2014, pipping Preston Lions FC by three points. The title win meant they were offered, and subsequently accepted, a place in the National Premier Leagues Victoria 2. They were placed in the NPL2 West conference for 2015. The club finished in 3rd place in NPL2 West and 5th overall.

Heading into season 2016, City added former Welsh Premier League player Emmanuel James Will Udo and former VPL Golden Boot winner Trent Rixon. Udo received a call up to the South Sudan national team for their upcoming African Cup of Nations qualifiers against Benin following his seven goal haul in the opening four matches of the season that saw City manage seven points. Moreland finished in 7th place in the 10-team league in 2016.

In 2017, City finished in 3rd place in NPL2 West. At the end of the home and away season, Ryan Burns was crowned undisputed Training Champion, receiving the club's highest honour. Abraham Tsitsiaridis finished runner up, with his ability to weave in and out of cones and leap over mini hurdles exemplifying the warrior spirit of the club.

Prior to the 2018 season, Moreland City signed former A-League player Jesse Makarounas. Moreland finished in 2nd place in the NPL2 East. As a result, they faced St Albans Saints in the NPL2 promotion playoff, winning 4-1. They then faced off against nine-time state champions Green Gully for a spot in the National Premier Leagues Victoria top division in 2019. Moreland gave up a 2-0 lead, conceding twice in second-half stoppage-time and then another in extra-time to miss their chance on promotion.

Ground 
Moreland City play out of Campbell Reserve in Coburg, Victoria. In October 2018, Moreland unveiled a new, female-friendly pavilion, worth $1.5 million. The project also included the refurbishment of the two football pitches including irrigation, drainage and resurfacing with warm season grass.

Honours
National Premier Leagues Victoria 2 Champions 2022
Victorian State League Division 1 North West Champions 2014

References

External links
 Official Club Website

Association football clubs established in 1912
Soccer clubs in Melbourne
1912 establishments in Australia
Sport in the City of Merri-bek